Sir Vincent Henry Penalver Caillard (23 October 1856 – 18 March 1930) was a British Army officer, financier and municipal politician. He served as President of the Ottoman Public Debt Council and the Financial Director of Vickers. He was also a member of Joseph Chamberlain's Tariff Commission and a county alderman on the London County Council for the Municipal Reform Party.

He was President of the Federation of British Industries in 1919.

A close associate of Sir Basil Zaharoff, Caillard played a key role in making Zaharoff's services available to H. H. Asquith and David Lloyd George as an agent of influence in the Levant.

References

External links 

 

1856 births
1930 deaths
Deputy Lieutenants of Wiltshire
British financiers
British industrialists
Municipal Reform Party politicians
Knights Bachelor
Members of London County Council
People educated at Eton College
Graduates of the Royal Military Academy, Woolwich
Royal Engineers officers
20th-century British writers
British composers